Cichlastomatini is a tribe of cichlids from South America, one of two tribes that make up the subfamily Cichlasomatinae. They were recognised in 1983 as an assemblage by the Swedish ichthyologist Sven O. Kullander by their four rather than five  5 dentary foramina in the lateralis canal system of the head, describing them as closely related to the genus Cichlasoma. Melanie Stiassny suggested that these fishes recognised as a clade by Kullander were divided into two groupings in 1991 which she termed cichlasomines and heroines, Kullander formally raised these to the tribes Cichlasomatini and Heroini of the subfamily Cichlasomatinae in 1999. In other classifications the tribe Cichlasomatini is placed in the subfamily Cichlinae.

Characteristics
The members of the Cichlasomatini are characterised most obviously by the possession of relatively large scales, especially shown in the arrangement of the scales in front of the dorsal fin where there are eight scales along midline rather than over 10 scales. Stiassny posited in 1991 that laying eggs in a tight circular clutch was a synapomorphy of the cichlasomines.

Genera
The following genera are considered to be classified under the tribe Cichlasomatini:

 Acaronia Myers, 1940
 Aequidens C. H. Eigenmann & W. L. Bray, 1894
 Andinoacara Musilová, Říčan & Novák, 2009
 Bujurquina S. O. Kullander, 1986
 Cichlasoma Swainson, 1839
 Cleithracara S. O. Kullander & Nijssen 1989
 Ivanacara Römer & Hahn, 2006
 Krobia S. O. Kullander & Nijssen, 1989
 Laetacara S. O. Kullander, 1986
 Nannacara Regan, 1905
 Rondonacara Ottoni & Mattos, 2015
 Tahuantinsuyoa S. O. Kullander, 1986

References

 
Cichlasomatinae
Cichlinae